Gorinchem Noord is a planned railway station, in Gorinchem, Netherlands.

History
The station was set to open in 2011. The station lies on the Merwede-Lingelijn (Dordrecht - Geldermalsen) and is located between Gorinchem and Arkel. The station is primarily for northern Gorinchem, where there is an industrial estate and the Da Vinci College, and small settlements in the area. It is still unknown when construction work will begin. The station plan has been accepted.

Other planned stations
There are more stations set to open in 2011 on the Merwede-Lingelijn. These are:

 Boven-Hardinxveld
 Giessendam West
 Leerdam Broekgraaf
 Sliedrecht Baanhoek

Railway stations in South Holland
Proposed railway stations in the Netherlands
Gorinchem Noord railway station